Artemas Hale (October 20, 1783 – August 3, 1882) was a U.S. Representative from Massachusetts.

Born in Winchendon, Massachusetts, Hale received a limited education and worked on a farm.  He taught school in Hingham, Massachusetts from 1804 to 1814.  He became interested in the manufacture of cotton gins in Bridgewater.  He served as member of the Massachusetts House of Representatives in 1824, 1825, 1827, and 1828.  He served in the Massachusetts Senate in 1833 and 1834.  He was again a member of the Massachusetts House of Representatives 1838-1842.  He served as delegate to the state constitutional convention in 1853.

Hale was elected as a Whig to the Twenty-ninth and Thirtieth Congresses (March 4, 1845 – March 3, 1849).  He engaged in agricultural pursuits.  He served as presidential elector on the Republican ticket in 1864.  He died in Bridgewater, Massachusetts, August 3, 1882.  He was interred in Mount Prospect Cemetery.

References

1783 births
1882 deaths
Members of the Massachusetts House of Representatives
Massachusetts state senators
People from Bridgewater, Massachusetts
People from Winchendon, Massachusetts
Massachusetts Republicans
Whig Party members of the United States House of Representatives from Massachusetts
1864 United States presidential electors
19th-century American politicians